Solenocera is a genus of prawns in the family Solenoceridae. Solenocera occur from 0 to 2,067 meters deep in the ocean.

Species 
Species include:
 Solenocera acuminata Pérez Farfante & Bullis, 1973
 Solenocera africana Stebbing, 1917
 Solenocera agassizii Faxon, 1893
 Solenocera alfonso Pérez Farfante, 1981
 Solenocera algoensis Barnard, 1947
 Solenocera alticarinata Kubo, 1949
 Solenocera annectens Wood-Mason in Wood-Mason & Alcock, 1891
 Solenocera atlantidis Burkenroad, 1939
 Solenocera australiana Pérez Farfante & Grey, 1980
 Solenocera barunajaya Crosnier, 1994
 Solenocera bedokensis Hall, 1962
 Solenocera bifurcata Dall, 1999
 Solenocera burukovskyi Timofeev, 1993
 Solenocera choprai Nataraj, 1945
 Solenocera comata Stebbing, 1915
 Solenocera crassicornis H. Milne Edwards, 1837
 Solenocera faxoni de Man, 1907
 Solenocera florea Burkenroad, 1938
 Solenocera geijskesi Holthuis, 1959
 Solenocera gurjanovae Starobogatov, 1972
 Solenocera halli Starobogatov, 1972
 Solenocera hextii Wood-Mason & Alcock, 1891
 Solenocera koelbeli de Man, 1911
 Solenocera maldivensis Borradaile, 1910
 Solenocera mascarensis Burukovsky, 1993
 Solenocera melantho de Man, 1907
 Solenocera membranacea Risso, 1816
 Solenocera moosai Crosnier, 1985
 Solenocera mutator Burkenroad, 1938
 Solenocera necopina Burkenroad, 1939
 Solenocera pectinata (Spence Bate, 1888)
 Solenocera pectinulata Kubo, 1949
 Solenocera phuongi Starobogatov, 1972
 Solenocera rathbuni Ramadan, 1938
 Solenocera spinajugo Hall, 1961
 Solenocera vioscai Burkenroad, 1934
 Solenocera waltairensis M.J. George & Muthu, 1970
 Solenocera zarenkovi Starobogatov, 1972

References 

Decapod genera
Taxa named by Hippolyte Lucas

Solenoceridae